Book of the Dead is a 2007 crime novel written by Patricia Cornwell. It is the fifteenth book in the popular Kay Scarpetta series and the fourth consecutive novel in the series to be written in third-person omniscient style, rather than Cornwell's traditional first-person narrative.

Synopsis 
Kay Scarpetta has started a private practice in South Carolina. She is called to Rome to consult in the murder investigation of teenage American tennis star Drew Martin. When in Rome, Kay becomes engaged to her longtime lover Benton Wesley, an occurrence that has devastating consequences for Kay’s longtime friend and investigative partner, Pete Marino. The timing is bad as the killer of Drew Martin, quickly known as the Sandman, spreads death and destruction from Italy to the American South. Passively assisted by his estranged parents, both known by if not loved by Kay, and his ex-girlfriend who has devious deeds of her own to do, the Sandman is an international mystery for Kay, Benton, Marino, and Kay’s niece Lucy.

Characters 
Dr. Kay Scarpetta
Benton Wesley – FBI profiler. He is described in the following way:
Lucy Farinelli – Kay's niece. Described as being, "a genius, an impossible little holy terror of enigmatic Latin descent whose father died when she was small. Her mother Dorothy (Scarpetta's sister), who was too caught up in writing children's books to worry much about her flesh-and-blood daughter."
Pete Marino – Detective Sergeant in the Richmond Police Department. Described as "pushing fifty, with a face life had chewed on, and long wisps of greying hair parted low on one side and combed over his balding pate. At least six feet tall, he was bay-windowed from decades of bourbon or beer".
Rose – Kay's secretary
Dr. Marilyn Self - A manipulative and dangerous psychiatrist famous for her television show. Dr. Self’s vendetta against Kay allows the Sandman to continue his evil work

Reception 
Cornwell's Scarpetta series has been criticized for being repetitive and morbid by some critics whilst other reviewers claim that the characters in Cornwell's recent books have been "shallow" and "overused". Others have praised the series for the unique plots in the series and Cornwell's characterisation of Scarpetta.

References 

Novels by Patricia Cornwell
2007 American novels
American crime novels